Orri Vigfússon (10 July 1942 – 1 July 2017) was an Icelandic entrepreneur and environmentalist. His stated objective was to "restore the abundance of wild salmon that formerly existed on both sides of the North Atlantic".

In 2004 Time magazine named him a "European Hero". He was awarded the Goldman Environmental Prize in 2007 for his efforts on saving endangered species.
<ref name=bbc-april2007>"Salmon campaigner lands top award" – BBC News (Sunday, 22 April 2007) (Retrieved on March 26, 2008)</ref>  In 2008, he was elected as a Senior Global Fellow to the Ashoka Fellowship.

He died on 1 July 2017 in Reykjavik of lung cancer at the age of 74.

Mark Kurlansky dedicated his 2020 book, Salmon'', to the memory of Orri Vigfússon.

References

1942 births
2017 deaths
Orri Vigfusson
Orri Vigfusson
Fish conservation
Articles containing video clips
Orri Vigfusson
Goldman Environmental Prize awardees
Ashoka Fellows